Pisilis, also known as Panormus or  Panormos (Πάνορμος), was a small port town of ancient Caria, between Calynda and Kaunos.

Its site is located within Sarıgerme beach near the modern Babadağ.

References

Populated places in ancient Caria
Former populated places in Turkey
Ortaca District
History of Muğla Province